The Nakhchivan trolleybus system was a system of trolleybuses forming part of the public transport arrangements in Nakhchivan, the capital of the eponymous Nakhchivan Autonomous Republic of Azerbaijan, for nearly 20 years from 1986.

The system was opened on 3 November 1986. In 1990, the fleet comprised 29 vehicles of type ZiU-9; at its height, the system consisted of three lines. It was closed in April 2004.

See also

History of Nakhchivan

List of trolleybus systems
Trolleybuses in former Soviet Union countries

References

External links

 
 

Nakhchivan
Nakhchivan (city)
Nakhchivan